Robert Kakeeto (born 19 May 1995) is a Ugandan professional footballer who plays for Danish club Middelfart, on loan from AaB, as a midfielder.

Club career
Kakeeto moved from Uganda to Denmark in 2013 to play for Nordjyllands Idrætshøjskole. In September 2015 he signed a contract until June 2018 with AaB.

Kakeeto was loaned out on 31 August 2018 to Jammerbugt FC in the Danish 2nd Division for the rest of the season.

On 13 August 2019, Kakeeto was loaned out to Finnish club HIFK until the end of November. On 31 August 2021, he was loaned out again, this time to Danish 2nd Division club Skive for the rest of the 2021–22 season. On 27 July 2022, he was once again loaned out, to Middelfart Boldklub for the upcoming season.

International career
He made his international debut for Uganda on 2 June 2017, in a friendly match against Ethiopia.

References

 

1995 births
Living people
Ugandan footballers
Uganda international footballers
AaB Fodbold players
Jammerbugt FC players
HIFK Fotboll players
Skive IK players
Middelfart Boldklub players
Danish Superliga players
Danish 2nd Division players
Veikkausliiga players
Association football midfielders
Ugandan expatriate footballers
Ugandan expatriate sportspeople in Denmark
Expatriate men's footballers in Denmark
Ugandan expatriate sportspeople in Finland
Expatriate footballers in Finland